December Moon is the debut demo tape by Swedish metal band Morbid. The album was recorded at Thunderload Studios in Stockholm on 5 and 6 December 1987. With this demo, Morbid became notorious and had a great impact upon the Swedish death metal scene. December Moon was reissued in 1994 and 2000.

Track listing
 "My Dark Subconscious" – 4:41
 "Wings of Funeral" – 3:47
 "From the Dark" – 6:00
 "Disgusting Semla" – 3:17

2000 reissue
 "My Dark Subconscious" (rehearsal)
 "Wings of Funeral" (rehearsal)
 "Tragic Dream / From the Dark" (rehearsal)
 "Citythrasher" (rehearsal)
 "Deathexecution" (rehearsal)
 "Disgusting Semla" (rehearsal)

Credits
Dead – vocals
 Pukes – guitar, backing vocals
John Lennart – guitar, backing vocals
Dr. Schitz – bass
Drutten – drums, additional vocals

References

Demo albums
1987 debut albums
Morbid (band) albums